Paul Meister (20 January 1926 – 17 December 2018) was a Swiss fencer. He won a bronze medal in the team épée event at the 1952 Summer Olympics.

References

External links
 

1926 births
2018 deaths
Sportspeople from Basel-Stadt
Swiss male fencers
Olympic fencers of Switzerland
Fencers at the 1952 Summer Olympics
Fencers at the 1960 Summer Olympics
Fencers at the 1964 Summer Olympics
Olympic bronze medalists for Switzerland
Olympic medalists in fencing
Medalists at the 1952 Summer Olympics
20th-century Swiss people